Zannino (born Yannis Papadopoulos; 21 August 1923 – 27 May 1995) was a Greek actor. He appeared in more than eighty films from 1956 to 1991.

Filmography

References

External links
 

1923 births
1995 deaths
Greek male actors
Constantinopolitan Greeks
20th-century Greek male actors
Male actors from Istanbul
People from Beyoğlu
Actors from Piraeus
People from Galata